One Shot is a 2005 Sri Lankan Sinhala action film remake from Tamil super hit film Baashha. This film was directed by Ranjan Ramanayake and produced by Soma Edirisinghe for EAP Films. It stars Ranjan Ramanayake and Anarkali Akarsha in lead roles along with Wilson Karunaratne and Rex Kodippili. The music was composed by Somapala Rathnayake. The film's sequel, Ranja - One Shot One 2, was released in 2014. It is the 1051st Sri Lankan film in the Sinhalese cinema. The film was also screened in India.

Overview
One Shot is used anamorphic lenses and Digital Theater System sound. The plot revolves around the character "One Shot" who fights against injustice and corrupted politicians.

Cast
 Ranjan Ramanayake as Vijaya aka 'One Shot'
 Wilson Karunaratne as Minister Walisundara
 Anarkali Akarsha as Sherry
 Anton Jude as Johnny
 Rex Kodippili as Cabinet minister Sallala Arachchi
 Kanchana Mendis as Vishaka
 Manike Attanayake as Rani
 Sriyani Amarasena as Vijaya's aunt
 Tyrone Michael as Dharme
 Ajith Lokuge as Somey
 Sandun Wijesiri as Vijaya's uncle
 Ariyasena Gamage as Regional minister
 Sunil Perera as Pushpakumara
 Ranjith Perera as Principle
 Susantha Chandramali as School Teacher
 Buddhika Rambukwella as Anandan
 Vasana Danthanarayana as Mohammad's Wife Nirmala
 Himali Siriwardena as Vijaya's dancer friend
 Kalum Wijesooriya as Inspector Mohammad
 Rajitha Hiran as Pushpakumara's secretary
 Anoja Weerasinghe as Ranjani
 Janesh Silva as Bowser
 Upali Keerthisena as Sathyapala
 D.B. Gangodathenna as Doctor Kallepotha
 Ravindra Randeniya as Police DIG
 Ignatius Gunaratne as Wijeratne 
 Nilanthi Dias as Sherry's friend
 Srinath Maddumage as Wickie
 Sarath Chandrasiri as Poisoning waiter
 Don Guy as Horse Inspector
 Jeevan Handunnetti as Wedding officiator
 Nanda Wickramage as Buddhist monk
 Anusha Damayanthi in cameo appearance
 Sahan Ranwala as Inspector Ajaya, Vijaya's brother
 Chathura Perera as Toddy maker

References

2005 films
2005 action drama films
Films set in Sri Lanka (1948–present)
2000s Sinhala-language films